The 2000–2001 Maryland Terrapins men's basketball team represented the University of Maryland in the 2000–2001 college basketball season as a member of the Atlantic Coast Conference (ACC). The team was led by head coach Gary Williams and played their home games at the Cole Field House. They were the first team to reach the Final Four in school history.

Pre-season

Accolades
Team
ESPN/USA Today ranked No. 7
AP ranked No. 5

Terence Morris
Naismith Award Player of the Year candidate
Wooden Award Player of the Year candidate
Playboy First Team All-American

Lonny Baxter, Juan Dixon
Naismith Award Player of the Year candidate
Wooden Award Player of the Year candidate

Roster

Season Recap

Accolades
Juan Dixon1st Team All-ACC
Lonny BaxterNCAA West Regional MVP2nd Team All-ACC

Schedule

|-
!colspan=12| Exhibition

|-
!colspan=12| Regular season

|-
!colspan=12| ACC tournament

|-
!colspan=12| 2001 NCAA men's basketball tournament

References

Maryland Terrapins men's basketball seasons
Maryland
NCAA Division I men's basketball tournament Final Four seasons
Maryland
Maryland
Maryland